"UNIO" High School (Romanian: Grupul Școlar Industrial Construcții de Mașini "UNIO") is a public day high school for students aged 14 to 18, established in 1948 and located in Satu Mare, Romania.

The school is named after a local company, UNIO Satu Mare, specialised in producing equipment for the mining, transport and energy industries.

History
The high school was founded on May 29, 1948, as a professional school which had to train skilled workers for the UNIO industrial company located in Satu Mare. In 1967, the school received its first classrooms and established itself as one of the best professional schools, high schools, and foreman's schools in the city.

From its founding, the school functioned in a nationalised building, built in 1916, located at the intersection between Mihai Eminescu Street and Alexandru Ioan Cuza Street. In 1972, the high school was expanded with another building that houses 12 machine shops and with a sports field which has two terraces that can accommodate around 100 people.

Present
The school has 40 classrooms organised in laboratories and cabinets. Among these there are four informatics cabinets and 13 machine shops equipped with all the right learning materials, many of which were actually manufactured by students (especially the machine shop equipment).

The institution also has a certified driving school, with two Dacia 1410s, where students can obtain the B–class driver's license. UNIO High School has an amphitheatre of 300 seats, a medical cabinet, a library with 30,000 volumes, a gym and two sports fields.

Alumni
Mircea Bolba – footballer and coach
Zoltan Ritli – FC Steaua București goalkeeper
Daniel Prodan – FC Steaua București defender
Adrian Pop – fencing champion

References

Educational institutions established in 1948
Schools in Satu Mare
High schools in Romania
1948 establishments in Romania